Sajda is a Ghazal poem album.

Sajda or Sajdah may also refer to:
 As-Sajdah - a Surah of the Quran.
 Sajdah - a prostration to Allah in Salah.
 Sajdahgah - a place of prostration in Islam.
 Sajda Ahmed - an Indian politician.
 Aakhri Sajda - a Bollywood film.

See also
 Sujud (disambiguation)
 Sajid (disambiguation)
 Prostration (disambiguation)